Endre Juhász (born 1944) is a Hungarian jurist who has served as a judge of the European Court of Justice since 2004.

Career
Juhász began his professional career working in the Department of the Ministry of Foreign Trade in 1966, becoming Director for Legislative Matters in 1973. He then moved to Brussels to take the position of First Commercial Secretary at the Hungarian Embassy, Brussels, responsible for European Community issue until 1979.

Juhász later became the Ambassador and Chief of Mission of the Republic of Hungary to the European Union from 1995 until May 2003.

He later left the Hungarian Government to take a position as a Member of the European Court of Justice in May 2004.

Education
Juhász studied law at the University of Szeged in Hungary, graduating in 1967. He continued his studies in comparative law at the University of Strasbourg from 1969 to 1972.

See also
 List of members of the European Court of Justice

References

European Court of Justice judges
Ambassadors of Hungary
University of Strasbourg alumni
1944 births
Living people

University of Szeged alumni